Art MacBaron O'Neill (Irish: Art mac Baron Ó Néill) (died 1618) was an Irish landowner and soldier of the Elizabethan and early Stuart eras. He is sometimes referred to as Arthur O'Neill.

Biography
O'Neill was part of the O'Neill dynasty of Ulster, the illegitimate son of Matthew O'Neill, 1st Baron Dungannon. His 'middle name' was a patronymic, referring to his father's title. 

He was the half-brother of Brian O'Neill, Cormac MacBaron O'Neill and Hugh O'Neill, Earl of Tyrone. O'Neill ruled over Oneilland south of Lough Neagh. He could speak fluent English unlike many of his relations.

O'Neill fought alongside his brother during Tyrone's Rebellion (1594-1603). Despite a series of defeats against the Irish Army that culminated in the burning of their capital at Dungannon and retreat into the woods, they were able to agree the Treaty of Mellifont which restored them to royal favour under the new King James I. O'Neill and his brothers were pardoned for their past activities and had their lands restored to them. He died in 1618.

Family
O'Neill had nine sons, one of whom was Owen Roe O'Neill who served as a mercenary in the Spanish Army for many years before returning to Ireland during the Irish Confederate Wars. Six of his other sons died during Tyrone's Rebellion, and Brian O'Neill was hanged as an outlaw in 1607. The two remaining sons also served in the Spanish Army.

Notes

References

People of Elizabethan Ireland
17th-century Irish people
16th-century Irish people
Irish soldiers
People from County Tyrone
1618 deaths
Year of birth unknown